Wire Daisies is an eponymous studio album by the group Wire Daisies released in 2007 (US release in 2008).

Track listing

Track listing (US Edition)

2007 albums
Wire Daisies albums